The 2018 Wagner Seahawks football team represented Wagner College in the 2018 NCAA Division I FCS football season as a member of the Northeast Conference (NEC). They were led by fourth-year head coach Jason Houghtaling and played their home games at Wagner College Stadium. Wagner finished the season 4–7 overall and 3–3 in NEC play to place fourth.

Previous season
The Seahawks finished the 2017 season 4–7, 2–4 in NEC play to finish in a tie for fifth place.

Preseason

NEC coaches poll
The NEC released their preseason coaches poll on July 24, 2018, with the Seahawks predicted to finish in fifth place.

Preseason All-NEC team
The Seahawks placed two players on the preseason all-NEC team.

Offense

Ryan Fulse – RB

Defense

Quintin Hampton – LB

Schedule

Game summaries

Bowie State

at Syracuse

at Montana State

Sacred Heart

at Monmouth

at Campbell

Saint Francis (PA)

at Central Connecticut

Duquesne

at Bryant

at Robert Morris

References

Wagner
Wagner Seahawks football seasons
Wagner Seahawks football